Oda of Metz (c. 910 – 10 April 963) was a German noblewoman.

She was the daughter of Count Gerard of Metz. Her mother Oda of Saxony was a daughter of Otto I, Duke of Saxony and thus a member of the Liudolfings. One of her brothers was Henry the Fowler. Because of this family connection Oda was a aunt of the first Holy Roman Emperor, Otto I the Great.

In 930, Oda married Gozlin, Count of Bidgau and Methingau, who gained fame as military commander for his brother, Adalberon I of Metz. Because she outlived her husband by twenty years, she was head of the household and ran the estate and lands until their children had reached adulthood.

They had the following children:

Reginar, count of Bastogne (d. 18 April 963)
Henry (d. 6 September 1000)
Godfrey (935/940 – 3 September 995/1002), count of Verdun
Adalberon (935/940 – 23 January 989), archbishop of Reims 969-989.

References

Sources

910s births
963 deaths
10th-century German nobility
10th-century German women